Events in the year 1994 in Ukraine.

Incumbents 

 President: Leonid Kravchuk (until 19 July), Leonid Kuchma (from 19 July)
 Prime Minister: Yukhym Zvyahilsky (until 16 June), Vitaliy Masol (from 16 June)

Events 

 5 December – The Budapest Memorandum on Security Assurances was signed at the OSCE conference in Budapest, Hungary.

Deaths 
 5 January - Igor Boelza, music historian and composer

References 

 
Ukraine
Ukraine
1990s in Ukraine
Years of the 20th century in Ukraine